Allegra Fuller Snyder (August 28, 1927 – July 11, 2021) was an American dance ethnologist (ethnochoreologist), choreographer, professor, and author specializing in dance and culture. Her research focused on dances among Native American nations, particularly the Yaqui, and on dance among several ethnic groups in Africa and Asia. She was Professor Emerita of dance ethnology from the University of California at Los Angeles (UCLA).

Family
Snyder was the daughter of noted architect and inventor Buckminster Fuller and his wife Anne Hewlett.

Career
Snyder pioneered the field of Dance Ethnography, and defined a dance ethnologist as "...one who is concerned with studying the process of dance in culture." She went on to state that "This field of investigation has been the major focus of my life and work for the last thirty-plus years." She was Director of the Graduate Program in Dance Ethnology at UCLA, as well as chairing the Department of Dance. She retired in 1991. She has previously taught at the California Institute of the Arts, and Naropa University.

Documentaries
Snyder also directed several documentaries on dance practices around the world.

Publications 
 Securing Our Dance Heritage: Issues in the Documentation and Preservation of Dance., 1999, Council on Library and Information Resources
 ‘Filmed in "Holly-Vision": Hollywood Images of World Dance,’ chapter in Looking Out: Perspectives on Dance and Criticism in a Multicultural World., David Gere, ed. New York: NY, Dance Critics Association, 1995.

References

External links
 Allegra Fuller Snyder's website
 Allegra Fuller Snyder's page at UCLA

American female dancers
American dancers
UCLA School of the Arts and Architecture faculty
Dance writers
Ethnochoreologist
Buckminster Fuller